Bloom Township may refer to:

 Bloom Township, Cook County, Illinois
 Bloom Township, Clay County, Kansas
 Bloom Township, Ford County, Kansas
 Bloom Township, Osborne County, Kansas, in Osborne County, Kansas
 Bloom Township, Nobles County, Minnesota
 Bloom Township, Stutsman County, North Dakota, in Stutsman County, North Dakota
 Bloom Township, Fairfield County, Ohio
 Bloom Township, Morgan County, Ohio
 Bloom Township, Scioto County, Ohio
 Bloom Township, Seneca County, Ohio
 Bloom Township, Wood County, Ohio
 Bloom Township, Clearfield County, Pennsylvania

Township name disambiguation pages